Galiella is a genus of fungi in the family Sarcosomataceae. The genus is widely distributed in northern temperate regions, and according to one estimate, contains eight species.

Taxonomy
Galiella was described in 1957 by Richard Korf and John Axel Nannfeldt. In the early 1950s, French mycologist Marcelle Louise Fernande Le Gal used the generic name Sarcosoma to treat several species that she did not think belonged in the same genus as Sarcosoma globosum, the type species. As Korf later pointed out, this usage contravened the rules of botanical nomenclature. Korf and Nannfield proposed Galiella to accommodate these species, and set G. rufa as the type. The generic name honors French mycologist Marcelle Louise Fernande Le Gal.

Description
Galiella includes bulgarioid species (those with a morphology similar to those in Bulgaria) with spores featuring surface warts that are made of callose-pectic substances that stain with methyl blue dye.

Species
Galiella amurensis
Galiella coffeata
Galiella japonica
Galiella rufa
Galiella sinensis
Galiella spongiosa
Galiella thwaitesii

References

External links
Mushroom Observer Images

Pezizales
Pezizales genera
Taxa named by John Axel Nannfeldt
Taxa described in 1957
Taxa named by Richard P. Korf